Cwrtnewydd, or Cwrt-newydd, or Cwrt Newydd, is a village in the community and parish of Llanwenog, towards the south of the county of Ceredigion, Wales.

Cwrtnewydd is on the B4338 road, north of the A475, just to the west of the town of Lampeter and to the northwest of Llanybydder.

Notable people

 Abel Morgan (1673-1722), Welsh Baptist minister, born in Cwrtnewydd
 David Bevan Jones (1807–1863), (AKA Dewi Elfed),  Baptist minister in Cwrtnewydd, bard, and leading figure in the Latter Day Saint movement
 David Thomas (1828–1909), (AKA Dewi Hefin), poet and teacher, schoolmaster in Cwrtnewydd
  (1875-1964), poet and local historian, born in Cwrtnewydd
 Edgar Evans (1912-2007), operatic tenor, born in Cwrtnewydd

External links
 
 

Villages in Ceredigion